Charles Carmine Forte, Baron Forte   (26 November 1908 – 28 February 2007) was an Italian-born Scottish hotelier who founded the leisure and hotels conglomerate that ultimately became the Forte Group.

Early life
Charles Forte was born as Carmine Forte in Mortale, now Monforte, Casalattico, in the province of Frosinone, Italy on 26 November 1908, eldest son of Rocco Giovanni Forte and Maria Luigia, daughter of Michelangelo Antonio Forte. His parents were distantly related. He emigrated from Italy to Scotland at the age of four with his family.

He attended Alloa Academy and then St. Joseph's College, Dumfries as a boarder, followed by two years of studies in Rome.

Early career

After Rome, Forte rejoined his family, who had moved to Weston-super-Mare, where his father ran a café with two cousins. Charles' main training at the age of 21 came in Brighton, where he managed the Venetian.

At 26, he set up his first "milk bar" in 1935, the Strand Milk Bar Ltd. Soon he began expanding into catering and hotel businesses. At the outbreak of World War II, Forte was interned in the Isle of Man due to his Italian nationality, but he was released after only three months. After the war, his company became Forte Holdings Ltd and bought the Café Royal in 1954.

In the 1950s, he also opened the first catering facility at Heathrow Airport and the first full motorway service station in the UK for cars at Newport Pagnell, Buckinghamshire, on the M1 motorway in 1959. He purchased the Hungaria Restaurant in Lower Regent St. in 1955.

Later career

Trust Houses Group Ltd and Forte Holdings were merged in 1970 to become Trust House Forte or THF. Through mergers and expansion, Forte expanded the Forte Group into a multibillion-pound business. His empire included the Little Chef and Happy Eater roadside restaurants, Crest, Forte Grand, Travelodge and Posthouse hotels, as well as the wine merchant Grierson-Blumenthal and a non-controlling majority stake in the Savoy Hotel.

The Grierson-Blumenthal stake became a legally "forced" acquisition by the group. It had been a personal holding of Charles Forte and fellow directors of the group, supplying liquor to Forte restaurants and hotels at substantial personal profit, until the prejudice to shareholders was realised in the late 1970s (including possible prosecution under the Companies Act) which obliged its acquisition as a subsidiary.

Forte was the CEO from 1971 and chairman from 1982 (when his son Rocco took over as CEO) of the Group. Happy Eater and the five Welcome Break major road service outlets were bought from Hanson Trust PLC on 1 August 1986. In the 1990s, the company increased its nominal capital and agreed to the public listed companies compliance regime to become Forte Group plc.

Forte passed full control to his son Rocco in 1993, but soon the plc was faced with a hostile takeover bid from Granada. Ultimately, Granada succeeded with a £3.9 billion tender offer in January 1996, which left the family with about £350 million in cash.

On 28 February 2007, Forte died in his sleep at his home in London, aged 98. He is buried in West Hampstead Cemetery.

Honours and awards
Forte was knighted by The Queen Mother in 1970 and created a life peer on 2 February 1982 as Baron Forte, of Ripley in the County of Surrey. He was also a knight of the Sovereign Military Order of Malta.

Family
In January 1943, Forte married Irene Mary, daughter of Giovanni Chierico, of Venice; her family ran a delicatessen on Wardour Street, Soho. Lady Forte had been apprenticed to a Mayfair couturier, where she learned sewing and gained an appreciation of quality materials. After her father's death when she was 17, she ran the family shop for three months whilst her mother was in Italy; it was destroyed by a bomb during the Blitz in 1940. From the 1950s, Forte lived with an extended family including his parents and children at Greenway Gardens in Frognal, Hampstead, London. They attended services at the Roman Catholic St. Mary's Church in nearby Holly Lane, Hampstead.

Together, they had six children, five girls and a boy:
 The Hon. Sir Rocco John Vincent Forte (b. 1945), who was knighted in 1995. On 15 February 1986, he married Aliai Giovanna Maria Ricci in Rome. They have three children.
 The Hon. Olga Forte CBE (b. 1947), who was married firstly to the late Count Alessandro Polizzi and secondly, in 1993, to The Hon. William Shawcross. Olga had two children with Alessandro:
 Alexandra Polizzi, a hotelier and the presenter of Channel 5's The Hotel Inspector
Charlotte Polizzi (b.1973), who married TV celebrity Oliver Peyton 
 The Hon. Marie Louise Forte (b. 1950), who married Robert Alexander Burness and had two children.
 The Hon. Irene Forte (b. 1956), who married US Ambassador John Danilovich and had three children.
 The Hon. Giancarla Forte (b. 1959), who married Michael Ulic Anthony Alen-Buckley and had two children. 

Irene, Lady Forte died 12 September 2010, and she is buried with her husband.

Lord Forte's family came from Mortale (later renamed Monforte in his honour), in the Lazio region of Southern Italy, where he retained the family home.

References

1908 births
2007 deaths
Forte, Baron 
Life peers created by Elizabeth II
Knights Bachelor
20th-century Scottish businesspeople
Italian emigrants to the United Kingdom
Italian Roman Catholics
Scottish people of Italian descent
Scottish Roman Catholics
British hoteliers
People educated at St Joseph's College, Dumfries
People educated at Alloa Academy
People interned in the Isle of Man during World War II
Forte family